Monknash Coast is a coastal Site of Special Scientific Interest between Monknash and St Donats in the Vale of Glamorgan, southern Wales. It contains Nash Point and forms part of the Glamorgan Heritage Coast, bordered by Southerndown Coast to the northwest.

References

See also
List of Sites of Special Scientific Interest in Mid & South Glamorgan

Sites of Special Scientific Interest in the Vale of Glamorgan
Coast of the Vale of Glamorgan